Calbayog, officially the City of Calbayog, is a 1st class component city in the province of Samar, Philippines. According to the 2020 census, it has a population of 186,960 people.

It is the sixth largest city in terms of land and water areas in the Philippines. It is the nineteenth city of the Philippines. In 2020, Calbayog has 37,807 households with a population of 186,960 people, making up 24.7% of the total population of the province of Samar. Calbayog is one of the commercial trade centers in Eastern Visayas. Calbayog is subdivided into three major districts: Calbayog, Tinambacan and Oquendo.

History

Unraveling of Revolutionary Society, Katipunan 
After the exile of Rizal in Dapitan, the Katipunan was born in Binondo, Manila. Andres Bonifacio and his men moved heaven and earth to fight against the Spanish government then led by Gob. Heneral Polavieja. The katipunan expanded its membership from Luzon down to the Visayas Region, thereby increasing the number of Katipuneros in a span of one year. Sensing the secret plan of the Katipunan to overthrow the government, the Spanish authorities raided a Binondo printing press where subversive documents were found and confiscated. One of the documents seized was the list of members of the Katipunan. The name Benedicto Nijaga was one in the list, being the collector of revolutionary funds in the area. Upon learning of the arrests, Governor Polavieja ordered the arrest of all suspected members of the Katipunan. Nijaga was arrested together with twelve other katipuneros while campaigning for revolutionary funds. Shortly after they were jailed and reportedly tortured, a trial ensued, reminiscent of that of Rizal and other Filipino nationalists. The 13 men were convicted and sentenced to death. On January 11, 1897, the thirteen were taken to Bagumbayan field under heavy guard. Just before sunrise, the men were executed.

After Spain transferred power to USA
Colegio-Seminario de San Vicente de Paul (now Christ the King College and St. Vincent de Paul Seminary) were established in 1905 and La Milagrosa Academy was established in 1910.

On April 10, 1910, the Roman Catholic Diocese of Calbayog was created by virtue of the Papal Bull of Pope Pius X, comprising the islands of Samar and Leyte. Calbayog became the episcopal see of the diocese.

World War II and later
In 1942, the Japanese Army occupied Calbayog city. In 1945 the city was finally liberated by the Philippine Commonwealth troops and the guerrillas who had continued the fight against the Japanese throughout World War II. It was only much later that other dioceses in the region were created.
 
Republic Act No. 328, otherwise known as the City Charter of Calbayog was signed into law on July 15, 1948, by then President Elpidio Quirino. The first set of city officials, incumbent municipal officials of the place, were sworn in on October 16, 1948. The city comprises the territorial jurisdiction of the former Municipalities of Calbayog, Oquendo and Tinambacan.

2008: Death of a Judge
In January 2008 Roberto Navidad, a Regional Trial Court (RTC) judge was shot dead in Calbayog City outside a drug store at the corner of Gomez Street and Nijaga Boulevard. As of 2008, the crime was still unsolved. He was the 15th judge to be ambushed in the Philippines since July 20, 1999 (the 14th under the Arroyo government).

2011 Onwards: Political Deaths
On May 1, 2011, Calbayog's Mayor Reynaldo Uy was murdered by unknown gunmen. After his death, Vice-Mayor Ronaldo P. Aquino was sworn in as city mayor.

On March 8, 2021, approximately 10 years after the death of Mayor Uy, Mayor Ronaldo P. Aquino was ambushed and killed by members of the Samar Provincial Police while on his way to his son's birthday party. The van he was riding was pelted with multiple bullets from high-powered arms. Two of his personnel were also among the casualties of the ambush.
Vice Mayor Diego P. Rivera has been appointed as successor and is currently the Mayor of Calbayog City.

On June 9, 2021, a senate investigation led by Senator Ronald "Bato" de la Rosa was conducted where the PNP, NBI and members of the Aquino family presented their testimonies and findings. Charges have been filed on the policemen.

Upgrade of city status
In the last quarter of 2021, Samar 1st district congressman Edgar Mary Sarmiento proposed to convert the city of Calbayog from being a component city into an independent component city through the virtue of House Bill No. 10483.

Geography 

Flooding is minimized because of many rivers, brooks, streams and natural water conveyors that flow towards the sea.

Climate 
Calbayog experiences a variety of wind types: Amihan (northeastwind), Timog (southwind), Habagat (southwestwind), Canaway (northwest wind), Cabunghan (east wind), Dumagsa (southeast wind) and Salatan (west wind).

Calbayog has well distributed rainfall throughout the year, except during the summer months of February through May, when most parts of the city are dry. Heavy downpour is seldom experienced in the locality, therefore making Calbayog potentially appropriate for protective agricultural investment.

Barangays 
The city's 157 barangays are grouped in three districts.

Calbayog District 

The district is located in the southern and eastern boundaries of the city and is the main political and commercial District the city. The district is bounded to the north by the Oquendo and Tinambacan districts, to the south by the municipality of Santa Margarita and to the east by Matuguinao.

Tinambacan District 

The Tinambacan district is located along the northern boundaries of the city, it is bounded to the north by the municipality of San Isidro, to the south by the Calbayog district and to the east by the Oquendo district.

Oquendo District 
The Oquendo District is located along the northeastern boundaries of the city, it is bounded to the north by Lope De Vega, to the south by the Calbayog district, to the east by Silvino Lobos and to the west by the Tinambacan district.

Demographics 

According to the 2015 census, Calbayog has a population of 183,851 making up 23.6% of the entire population of Samar Province as of August 1, 2015.

Infrastructure

Utilities

Water and Sanitation
 Calbayog Water (now owned by Manila Water) is in charge of the water utility in Calbayog City.  As of 2017, it was using the Himonini River and Pasungon Falls as water sources. The Dawu interior of Danaw, water reservoir, a dam was built for the Calbayog City Water District near Malajog.  The dam was built for irrigation to nearby villages of Pilar and Dawu. The old dam or reservoir that was built near Oquendo is somewhat hefty and expensive since it uses river water and its expensive to purify the river water.  The new reservoir was connected to the old pipelines of Calbayog City Water District.  Some Fire truck Hydrants were located inside the City.

Energy and Power Samar I Electric Cooperative, Inc. (SAMELCO I) is located in Carayman, Calbayog.  It has three sub-stations powered by the Tongonan Geothermal Energy and transmissioned by National Grid Corporation of the Philippines (NGCP) to its main office in Carayman then to its three sub-stations at 3600 volts, stepped down.

Education

Colleges and Universities

Northwest Samar State University (formerly Tiburcio Tancinco Memorial Institute of Science and Technology)
Christ the King College
STI Calbayog
Seminario San Vicente de Paul

Vocational School

Rafael Lentejas Memorial School of Fisheries (Tinambacan) -honors-

High Schools and K-12

Christ the King College
Calbayog City National High School
Carayman National High School
Bagacay Integrated School
Rafael Lentejas Memorial School of Fisheries (Tinambacan and SantaMargarita Campus)
La Milagrosa Academy
Calbayog Pilot Central School
Calbayog City SPED Center
Calbayog East Central School
Calbayog Christian Faith Academy
St. Augustine International School
San Joaquin National High School
San Joaquin Central School
San Policarpo National High School
San Policarpo Central School
STI Calbayog Senior High School
Trinidad National High School  (Tomaligues Annex Campus)
Trinidad Central Elementary School
Tarabucan National High School
Mag-ubay National High School
Oquendo National High School
Tabawan Integrated School

Media

AM Stations
DYOG Radyo Pilipinas 882 (Philippine Broadcasting Service)

FM Sations
88.5 FMR Calbayog (Relay station of 100.7 FMR Tacloban; Philippine Collective Media Corporation)
89.5 DYNW Kauswagan Radio (Northwest Samar State University)
91.3 Radyo Kidlat (Philippine Broadcasting Service/Samar 1 Electric Cooperative)
92.1 Infinite Radio (St. Jude Thaddeus Institute of Technology)
95.5 BigTime FM (Samar Star Meda)
99.7 Super Radyo (RGMA Network/GMA Regional Network)
100.5 Brigada News FM (Brigada Mass Media Corporation)
102.3 Radyo Alternatibo (Prime Broadcasting Network)
104.9 Radyo Natin (Manila Broadcasting Company/Radyo Natin Network)

TV Stations
GMA TV-5 Calbayog
ABS-CBN TV-10 Calbayog
PTV-12 Calbayog
S+A Channel 24 Calbayog
GTV-32 Calbayog

Cable and Satellite
Fil-Products Cable Company
Calbayog Cable TV and Entertainment Services
Cignal TV

Notable personalities
Lieutenant Benedicto Nijaga (1864–January 11, 1897) — nicknamed “Biktoy”, one of the "Thirteen Martyrs of Bagumbayan", executed on January 11, 1897, in Bagumbayan (Luneta Park).
Alferez Biktoy — the namesake of a musical staged by the City Arts and Culture Office for the centennial celebration of Philippine independence
José Avelino — Third President of the Philippine Senate
Cardinal Julio Rosales — (September 18, 1906 – June 2, 1983) the second Archbishop of Cebu, was a Filipino cardinal of the Roman Catholic Church. A native of Calbayog, he made his studies at the Seminary of Calbayog and was ordained in his hometown on June 2, 1929. From 1929 to 1946, he did pastoral work in the diocese of Calbayog. He was consecrated bishop of Tagbilaran on September 21, 1946.

See also
Naval Base Calbayog
Calbayog Airport
Calbayog Cathedral

References

External links 

 Facebook: Calbayog Tourism Information Office
 LGU Calbayog Website
 [ Philippine Standard Geographic Code]
 Philippine Census Information
 Local Governance Performance Management System
 

 
Cities in Samar (province)
Populated places established in 1948
1948 establishments in the Philippines
Component cities in the Philippines